The following elections occurred in the year 1979.

Africa
 Algeria: presidential election
 Benin: parliamentary election
 Botswana: general election
 Gabon: presidential election
 Ghana: presidential election
 Kenya: general election
 Mali: general election
 Nigeria: 
 parliamentary election
 presidential election
 Ghana: general election
 Rhodesia: constitutional referendum
 Seychelles: general election
 Somali: parliamentary election
 Togo: general election
 Zimbabwe Rhodesia general election

Asia
 1979 Bangladeshi general election
 India: 
 1979 Indian vice presidential election
 1979 Indian Rajya Sabha elections
 1979 Nagapattinam by-election
 Iran: 
 March 1979 Iranian Islamic Republic referendum
 December 1979 Iranian constitutional referendum
 Japan: general election
 Mindanao: 1979 Sangguniang Pampook elections
 Philippines: 1979 Sangguniang Pampook elections

Australia
 1979 Norwood state by-election
 1979 South Australian state election
 1979 Tasmanian state election

Europe

Austria
 1979 Austrian legislative election

Denmark
 1979 Danish parliamentary election

European Parliament
 1979 European Parliament election
 in Belgium
 in Denmark
 in France
 in Greenland
 in Ireland
 in Italy
 in Sardinia
 in Veneto
 in Luxembourg
 in the Netherlands
 in the United Kingdom
 in West Germany

Finland
 1979 Finnish parliamentary election
 1979 Ålandic legislative election

France
 1979 European Parliament election in France
 1979 French cantonal elections

Germany
 1979 West German presidential election
 1979 European Parliament election in West Germany
 1979 Rhineland-Palatinate state election
 1979 West Berlin state election

Iceland
 1979 Icelandic parliamentary election

Ireland
 1979 Irish local elections
 1979 Fianna Fáil leadership election

Italy
 1979 European Parliament election in Italy
 1979 Italian general election

Luxembourg
 1979 Luxembourg general election

Norway
 1979 Norwegian local elections

Portugal
 1979 Portuguese legislative election
 1979 Portuguese local elections

Spain
 1979 Spanish general election

Sweden
 1979 Swedish general election
 1979 Stockholm municipal election

Switzerland
 1979 Swiss federal election

United Kingdom
 1979 United Kingdom general election
 List of MPs elected in the 1979 United Kingdom general election
 1979 Clitheroe by-election
 1979 European Parliament election in the United Kingdom
 1979 South West Hertfordshire by-election
 1979 Knutsford by-election
 1979 Liverpool Edge Hill by-election
 1979 Manchester Central by-election
 1979 Scottish devolution referendum
 1979 Ulster Unionist Party leadership election

United Kingdom local
 1979 United Kingdom local elections

English local
 1979 Manchester Council election
 1979 Trafford Council election
 1979 Wolverhampton Council election

North America
 1979 Belizean legislative election

Canada
 1979 Canadian federal election
 1979 Alberta general election
 1979 British Columbia general election
 1979 Edmonton municipal plebiscite
 1979 Newfoundland general election
 1979 Northwest Territories general election
 1979 Prince Edward Island general election

United States
 1979 United States gubernatorial elections

United States gubernatorial
 1979 Louisiana gubernatorial election
 1979 United States gubernatorial elections

Louisiana
 1979 Louisiana gubernatorial election

Oceania
 1979 Christchurch Central by-election

Australia
 1979 Norwood state by-election
 1979 South Australian state election
 1979 Tasmanian state election

See also

 
1979
Elections